This article contains a list in alphabetical order of cricketers who have played for Hampshire County Cricket Club in top-class matches since it was founded in 1863. The county club is classified as an important team by substantial sources from its first match in 1864 until 1885; classified as an official first-class team from 1895 by Marylebone Cricket Club (MCC) and the County Championship clubs; classified as a List A team since the beginning of limited overs cricket in 1963; and classified as a first-class Twenty20 team since the inauguration of the Twenty20 Cup in 2003. 

The details are the player's usual name followed by the years in which he was active as a Hampshire player. Note that many players represented other top-class teams besides Hampshire. Current players are shown as active to the latest season in which they played for the club. The list excludes Second XI and other players who did not play for the club's first team; and players whose first team appearances were in minor matches only. Players who represented the county before 1864 are included if they also played for the county club but excluded if not.

For more detailed information about the Hampshire players in each of the three main forms of top-class cricket, see the following:

 List of Hampshire County Cricket Club first-class players
 List of Hampshire County Cricket Club List A players
 List of Hampshire County Cricket Club Twenty20 players

A

B

C

D

E

F

G

H

I
 Imran Tahir (2008–2014): Imran Tahir
 Colin Ingleby-Mackenzie (1951–1966): ACD Ingleby-Mackenzie
 Lionel Isherwood (1919–1923): LCR Isherwood

J

K

L

M

N
 Jack Newman (1906–1930): JA Newman
 Edward Newton (1900): E Newton
 Mark Nicholas (1978–1995): MCJ Nicholas
 Victor Norbury (1905–1906): DV Norbury
 Marcus North (2009): MJ North
 Sam Northeast (2018–2021): SA Northeast
 Frank Burnell-Nugent (1904): FH Nugent
 Tom Nugent (2014): TM Nugent

O
 Eric Olivier (1911): E Olivier
 Sidney Olivier (1895): SR Olivier
 Felix Organ (2017–2022): FS Organ
 Hugh Orr (1902–1907): HJ Orr
 David O'Sullivan (1971–1973): DR O'Sullivan

P

Q
 Glen Querl (2013): RG Querl
 Francis Quinton (1895–1900): FWD Quinton
 James Quinton (1895–1899): JM Quinton

R

S

T

U
 George Ubsdell (1864–1870): G Ubsdell
 Shaun Udal (1989–2007): SD Udal
 George Underdown (1882–1885): G Underdown
 Richard Utley (1927–1928): RPH Utley

V
 Chaminda Vaas (2003): WPUJC Vaas
 Charles van der Gucht (2000): CG van der Gucht
 James Vince (2009–2022): JM Vince
 Adam Voges (2007): AC Voges

W

Y
 Charles Yaldren (1912): CH Yaldren
 Yasir Arafat (2015): Yasir Arafat
 Humphrey Yates (1910–1913): HWM Yates
 Charles Young (1867–1885): CR Young

See also
 List of Hampshire County Cricket Club captains

Notes

References

Bibliography
 
 
  

Players
Hampshire
Hampshire-related lists